"Say It Again" is a song written by Bunny Sigler and Carol Davis. It was originally recorded and released as a single by African-American singer Shawn Christopher in 1983. In 1984, American singer Lou Rawls recorded a version for his album Close Company. In 1985, Rége Burrell released his own version of the song as a single from his album Victim of Emotion. In 1986, American female R&B vocal trio Sinnamon recorded their own version, which was released as a single. The best known version is the 1987 recording by American singer Jermaine Stewart, released as a hit single from his album of the same name.

Jermaine Stewart version

In 1987, Jermaine Stewart's version of "Say It Again" was released as the lead single from his third studio album Say It Again. It was produced by Aaron Zigman and Jerry Knight. Continuing the commercial success of his 1986 hit "We Don't Have to Take Our Clothes Off", "Say It Again" was a hit in the United States and Europe. It reached No. 27 on the Billboard Hot 100 in 1988, while in the UK it peaked at No. 7 in 1987. It was also a Top 10 hit in Norway, and a Top 30 hit in the Netherlands.

A music video was filmed to promote the single. Stewart also performed the song on the popular UK music show Top of the Pops with his backing band "The Party" in February 1988. In the US, Stewart performed the song on American TV show Soul Train.

The single's B-side, "You Promise", was exclusive to the single, and was written by Stewart and Roy Carter.

Critical reception
Upon release, Cash Box listed the single as one of their "feature picks" during March 1988. They commented: "Stewart has about the brightest sounding voice in R&B, and it pokes through any kind of speaker, static, player and mental blockage. If he can't pierce through to the top 10 with this little pin-prick of a hit, we'd be shocked." In his 2015 book The Top 40 Annual 1988, James Masterton described the song as "one of the more enduring pop hits of the winter months" and noted the song's "clever production" and "expected Aaron Zigman-produced pop funk".

Formats
7" single
"Say It Again" - 4:07
"You Promise" - 4:47

12" single (US release)
"Say It Again (Extended Remix)" - 8:30
"You Promise" - 4:46
"Say It Again (Single Version)" - 4:07
"We Don't Have To Take Our Clothes Off (Extended Dance Mix)" - 5:54

12" single (European release)
"Say It Again (Extended Remix)" - 8:30
"Say It Again" - 4:07
"You Promise" - 4:47

CD single
"Say It Again" - 3:49
"We Don't Have To Take Our Clothes Off" - 4:04
"Dress It Up" - 4:42
"You Promise" - 4:47

Chart performance

Personnel
 Jermaine Stewart - vocals
 Jerry Knight - instruments
 Aaron Zigman - instruments
 Bill Reichenbach, Gary Grant, Jerry Hey, Kim Hutchcroft - horns
 Deniece Williams, James Ingram, Jerry Knight, Josie James, Marva King, Pam Hutchinson, Wanda Vaughn - backing vocals

Production
 Aaron Zigman, Jerry Knight - producers of "Say It Again"
 Csaba Petocz, Gary Wagner - engineers on "Say It Again"
 John Arrias - additional engineer on "Say It Again"
 Mick Guzauski - mixing and recording on "Say It Again"
 Phil Harding - additional production, mixing on "Say It Again (Extended Remix)"
 Ian Curnow - additional production and Fairlight programming on "Say It Again (Extended Remix)"
 Jermaine Stewart, Roy Carter - producers of "You Promise"
 Narada Michael Walden - producer of "We Don't Have to Take Our Clothes Off"

Other
 Bill Smith Studio - sleeve design
 Mark Le Bon - photography

References

1987 singles
Jermaine Stewart songs